Krzywaczka  is a village in the administrative district of Gmina Sułkowice, within Myślenice County, Lesser Poland Voivodeship, in southern Poland.

The village has an approximate population of 1,500.

References

Krzywaczka